Euptilon ornatum is a species of antlion in the family Myrmeleontidae. It is found in Central America and North America.

References

Further reading

External links

 

Myrmeleontidae
Articles created by Qbugbot
Insects described in 1773
Taxa named by Dru Drury